Conus aureonimbosus is a species of sea snail, a marine gastropod mollusk in the family Conidae, the cone snails and their allies.

These snails are predatory and venomous. They are capable of "stinging" humans, therefore live ones should be handled carefully or not at all.

Description
Original description: "Shell thin, fragile, slender and elongated; body whorl highly polished; numerous fine spiral cords around anterior end; shoulder sharp, obsoletely coronated with low undulations and rounded bumps; spire low; protoconch needle-like, protracted, projecting above spire; shell color pale cream-yellow overlaid with large amorphous, flammules of bright golden-yellow; mid-body with white band containing rows of pale tan dots and dashes; spire whorls white with dark orange and tan flammules; protoconch yellow, interior of aperture white; anterior tip of shell yellow; periostracum thin, yellow, transparent."

The shell of a Conus Aureonimbosus can vary in size between 33 mm and 61 mm. 
It has a light cream colored shell, with tan striations running throughout it.

Distribution
Locus typicus: "(Dredged from) 150 metres depth
50 kilometres South of Apalachicola, Florida, USA."

This marine species occurs in the North Atlantic Ocean off Florida
at a depth of 150 metres.

References

 Tucker J. T. (2013) The cone shells of Florida. An illustrated key and a review of the Recent species. 155 pp. Wellington, Florida: MdM Publishing.
  Puillandre N., Duda T.F., Meyer C., Olivera B.M. & Bouchet P. (2015). One, four or 100 genera? A new classification of the cone snails. Journal of Molluscan Studies. 81: 1–23

External links
 

aureonimbosus
Gastropods described in 1987